Started in Canada in 1985, Responsible Care is a global, voluntary initiative developed autonomously by the chemical industry for the chemical industry. It runs in 67 countries whose combined chemical industries account for nearly 90% of global chemical production.  96 of the 100 largest chemical producers in the world have adopted Responsible Care.

It stands for the chemical industry's desire to improve health, safety, and environmental performance.

The signatory chemical companies agree to commit themselves to improve their performances in the fields of environmental protection, occupational safety and health protection, plant safety, product stewardship and logistics, as well as to continuously improve dialog with their neighbors and the public, independent from legal requirements.

As part of Responsible Care initiative, the International Council of Chemical Associations introduced the Global Product Strategy in 2006.

Critical analyses of Responsible Care have been done by Andrew King and Michael Lenox, Michael Givel, and Moffet, Bregha and Middelkoop.

History
Responsible Care was launched by the Chemistry Industry Association of Canada (formerly the Canadian Chemical Producers' Association - CCPA) in 1985.  The term was coined by CIAC president Jean Bélanger.  The scheme evolved, and, in 2006, The Responsible Care Global Charter was launched at the UN-led International Conference on Chemicals Management in Dubai.

Controversy
Poisoning of river Elbe by the company Draslovka Kolin a.s., a Responsible Care certified company  or hiding of 20 metric tons leakage of naphthalene by the company Deza, also a Responsible Care company, questions whether the Responsible Care brings any real improvement or is just a marketing tool.

References

External links
Responsible Care web site
The Global Product Strategy pdf

Chemical industry